is a Japanese role-playing game released by Square in 1996, and the company's last developed for the Super Famicom.

The plot incorporates elements from Indian religions, centrally the concept of the wheel of time - every 4000 years the world is destroyed and recreated by a Rudra - the name taken from an aspect of the Hindu god of destruction, Shiva. With several races of beings already eradicated and replaced, the story takes place during the final 15 days before humans are scheduled to be wiped out as well.

Gameplay

The gameplay is divided into three main areas: the overworld map, the towns and dungeons, and battles. When in the overworld map, the player directs their characters to different locations in the game. Towns contain the prerequisite shops and villagers who offer information, while dungeons are mazelike affairs where random enemy encounters may occur. These battles may also strike on the overworld map and follow a typical RPG pattern: the player makes choices for their characters (such as whether to fight, cast a magic spell, or run away), and then the enemy takes a turn. This pattern repeats until the characters on one side all run out of hit points and die. There are 15 turns, accounting for each of the 15 days.

Magic system
The game features a magic system where the player can create magic spells by entering words up to six katakana characters. Whereas most console RPGs give the player access to a limited number of precreated spells, it allows the player nearly total creative freedom. The player can enter various magic words (called kotodama (言霊,ことだま) in the original) into their grimoire. Every one will have some effect, although most are not useful. There is an underlying framework to the system, however, which is based on the gameworld's elements.

A complete mantra generally consists of a prefix, elemental core, and suffix, although the core alone is enough to produce an effect. There are eight elements (plus healing), and of these, six are arranged in mutually antagonistic pairings: fire vs. water, wind vs. electricity, and light vs dark. The remaining two offensive elements, earth and void, have no strengths or weaknesses. Since spells are formed from letters, there are specific patterns corresponding to each element. Certain spells that use the root word tou for example, will produce lightning-based attacks, while those containing aqu will create water-based effects.

Additionally, there are prefixes and suffixes that can be added onto the base elements to change their attributes. Most of these influence the base power and cost to use the spell, but others add abnormal status effects (for example, poisoning the target) or change the mantra's range so that it only targets a single enemy instead of multiple ones or vice versa. Prefixes and suffixes with similar effects can be used in tandem to produce amplified effects.

Other mantras consist of unique words, many of them in English, that create certain effects and skip the naming system entirely. Many of these strange words are learned from in-game characters or by reading books. For example, geo is an earth-related mantra, and kingcoast is a water spell. Adding prefixes or suffixes to these usually makes something completely different (and often useless).  This use of spelled-out mantras allows the player to learn magic from even their enemies. When an enemy uses magic, the player has but to write down the spells used and then to enter them into his or her own grimoire after the battle in order to have access to them. Some of these enemy spells are extremely powerful, although many are not as cost-efficient as the basic spells described above. Some are more space-efficient versions of regular spells.

Plot

Setting and characters
The story is divided into three major scenarios, each with a different main character: the soldier Sion, the priestess Riza, and the archaeologist Surlent. As the player enters new areas and accomplishes different tasks, the human race's final 15 days slowly ebb away in a predetermined day/night cycle. The player is free to play the scenarios in any order, and may even leave one storyline to follow that of another character for a time. The actions of the characters in one location and time may have an effect on the others, as well, both in the general story and in gameplay. For example, if one group of characters leaves a sacred relic somewhere, another character may come and find it on a later day in their own part of the game. After successfully completing all three scenarios, players must take on a fourth, featuring the roving thief Dune and the heroes from the previous three chapters in their final confrontation with the game's major villains.

Story
Before the events of the game, the Majestic Four created the world, the most powerful of them being Mitra who was also the creator of the Earth and the moon. They then gave life to an entity known as a Rudra with power from the Guardian of Evolution, Gomorrah, who uses his Eternal Engine to facilitate new beings.

Every 4,000 years, a Rudra appears with a race of its own and the race that came before it is destroyed or driven to near extinction. Former Rudras have since become fossils that archaeologists refer to as Lago Stones. During the Great Cycle, the Danans were succeeded by the Merfolk, the Reptiles, the Giants and finally by the Humans.

At the start of the game, fifteen days remain before the coming of a new Rudra and the end of humanity begins. The characters Sion, Surlent, Riza and Dune each come into possession of a Jade, a treasure discovered in the Lago Stones. It is later revealed that Gomorrah requires the Jades in addition to other treasures to create a perfect Rudra, and that a weapon known as Sodom destroys every successive race from its lair on the moon.

After both Gomorrah and Sodom have been thwarted by the Jadebearers, they unite and board a Danan flying vessel known as the Ark to travel to the moon and confront Mitra. Upon defeating her, Mitra praises the Jadebearers for their strength and reveals that long ago the Majestic Four once fought a force known as the Destroyers who were a threat to the world. When the Majestic Four won, Mitra knew the Destroyers would one day return and resolved to defeat them by creating a perfect race through evolution while using the 4,000 year cycle to replace weak races with stronger ones. In an instant, Mitra passes on her knowledge of the Eternal Engine to Dune and also leaves the task of fighting the Destroyers to the human race.

During the ending, the party return home and experience a vision of a world brought to ruin by the Destroyers, which Dune interprets as a warning from Mitra. He considers using the Eternal Engine to evolve humanity, but the Jadebearers decide against it so they do not repeat Mitra's actions, and instead choose to let the human race evolve naturally.

Development
The character designer for the game was Keita Amemiya. Treasure of the Rudras was released for the Super Famicom on April 5, 1996, and was published by Squaresoft. It was the last Square-developed release for the Super Famicom as well as the last title with game director Kouzi Ide, who went on to retire after three titles. During the time it was released, most games had already moved onto 3D graphics, while this game still used 2D pixel art. It was never localized outside Japan; it was released late in the life of the Super Famicom. A fan translation was first released. The game's unique magic system was also considered to be a major obstacle for translators. It was released on the Wii Virtual Console in Japan on June 7, 2011, and the Wii U Virtual Console in Japan on December 2, 2015.

Music
The soundtrack was scored by Ryuji Sasai. A CD of the music was released shortly after the game on April 25, 1996. A CD of Square Enix music was released in Japan on July 4, 2012, and included a track of the game's music called "The Spirit Chaser (SURLENT)" by the Stealth Boys.

A sheet music edition subtitled "Original sound version" was released by Doremi in 1998, featuring every track of the game transcribed in simple arrangements for solo piano.

Reception

Brazilian magazine VideoGame commented that the title is an example of how the Super NES was the best console for role playing games, and this is just another example. They also praised the graphics and gameplay as being as high quality as Square's other series Final Fantasy.

The game has received praise in retrospective reviews as well. Games Radar praised the game's unique battle system of learning spells through words and combining them to make new ones, but noted that there were games from the mid-1990s that were more beatifically drawn and “narratively ambitious”. Retro Gamer also praised the game's magic system and also the unique approach of having three branching stories that players could exit and enter at will, and called the title a “hidden gem”. Destructoid compared the plot and its many shifting perspectives to Game of Thrones, but noted that the game did not appear to have been made with the same large budget as contemporary titles, and noted the difficulty of using the linguistic magic system. Jeuxvideo.com enjoyed the title's humorous cutscenes, but were critical of the game's lack of polish. Hobby Consolas called the title one of the best games ever released for the Super NES, praising the graphical detail and the innovative magic system.

References

External links
Rudra no Hihō at Square-Enix.com 

1996 video games
Japan-exclusive video games
Fantasy video games
Role-playing video games
Square (video game company) games
Super Nintendo Entertainment System games
Video games developed in Japan
Video games scored by Ryuji Sasai
Virtual Console games
Virtual Console games for Wii U
Video games based on Hindu mythology